Steve DaSilva (born February 10, 1987 in Saskatoon, Saskatchewan) is a Canadian ice hockey player who currently plays for the Lloydminster Border Kings of the Chinook Hockey League. He previously played for the Saskatchewan Huskies of the CIS and the Kootenay Ice of the Western Hockey League (WHL).

Awards
Named to WHL Eastern Conference First team All-Star in 2007 & 2008.
Won 2008-09 CIS Clare Drake Award

References

External links

1987 births
Living people
Canadian ice hockey right wingers
Ice hockey people from Saskatchewan
Kootenay Ice players
Saskatchewan Huskies ice hockey players
Sportspeople from Saskatoon